Two Hearts is the tenth studio album by English singer Dave Mason, released in 1987 on MCA Records.

Overview
Steve Winwood and Phoebe Snow perform on the album.

Singles
As a single "Something in the Heart" rose to No. 24 on the Billboard Mainstream Rock chart. "Dreams I Dream", featuring Phoebe Snow, also reached No. 11 on the Billboard Adult Contemporary Songs chart.

Track listing
Track listing adapted from album's text.

Personnel 
Credits adapted from album's text.
 Dave Mason – lead vocals, drum programming, acoustic piano (1), guitars (1, 2), guitar solo (4), additional vocals (6), lead guitar (8)
 Mike Lawler – synthesizers (1-4, 7), bass (1-4, 7), electric piano (2, 3), horns (2, 4, 8), slide guitar (6, 7), keyboards (8)
 Steve Winwood – backing vocals (1), Hammond organ (3), synthesizers (5), organ (7)
 Peter Seibert – keyboards (5, 6, 8), bass (5), horns (8)
 Kenny Lee Lewis – rhythm guitar (8)
 Larry Cohen – bass (6, 8), "jocko" bass (6)
 Jimmy Hotz – drum programming
 Bobbye Hall – percussion (4)
 Mike Finnigan – backing vocals (2, 3, 5, 8), additional vocals (6)
 Steve Neives – backing vocals (2, 8), saxophone (3), additional vocals (6)
 Phoebe Snow – backing vocals (3, 4, 5), lead vocals (4)

Production 
 Dave Mason – producer, art direction
 Jimmy Hotz – producer, engineer, mixing 
 Don Evans – assistant engineer
 Tim Farmer – assistant engineer
 Bjorn Thorsrud – assistant engineer
 Steve Hall – mastering 
 Jeff Adamoff – art direction
 Michael Diehl – design
 Dennis Keeley – photography
 Jack Kellman – management 
 Mixed at Granny's House (Reno, Nevada).
 Mastered at Future Disc (Hollywood, California).

References

1987 albums
Dave Mason albums
MCA Records albums
Albums produced by Dave Mason